Charles Tobias (August 15, 1898 – July 7, 1970) was an American songwriter.

Biography
Born in New York City, United States, Tobias grew up in Worcester, Massachusetts with brothers Harry Tobias and Henry Tobias, also songwriters. He started his musical career in vaudeville. In 1923, he founded his own music publishing firm and worked on Tin Pan Alley. Tobias referred to himself as "the boy who writes the songs you sing."

His credits include "Merrily We Roll Along," "Rose O'Day," "Those Lazy-Hazy-Crazy Days of Summer," "Comes Love," and "Don't Sit Under the Apple Tree (With Anyone Else but Me)." With frequent collaborators Al Sherman and Howard Johnson he wrote, "Dew-Dew-Dewey Day".

In the 1930s, Tobias and several of his fellow hit makers formed a revue called "Songwriters on Parade," performing across the Eastern seaboard on the Loew's and Keith circuits. He co-wrote the 1933 to 1936 Merrie Melodies theme song "I Think You're Ducky" with Gerald Marks and Sidney Clare. And, he later co-wrote the 1936-1964 Merrie Melodies theme song "Merrily We Roll Along" with Murray Mencher and Eddie Cantor. Immediately after Pearl Harbor, he and Cliff Friend wrote and recorded "We Did It Before and We Can Do It Again" on December 16, 1941. The song reminded the United States of World War I. From 1929 to 1960, he contributed songs to a number of musicals, such as "Manhattan Melodrama" and "The Daughter of Rosie O'Grady."

Tobias was inducted into the Songwriters Hall of Fame in 1970.  He died in Manhasset, Long Island, on July 7, 1970.

References

External links
New England Jazz History Database
Songwriters' Hall of Fame: Profile: Charles Tobias
Charles Tobias recordings at the Discography of American Historical Recordings.

1898 births
1970 deaths
Jewish American songwriters
20th-century American composers
20th-century American Jews